Suits is an American television drama series created by Aaron Korsh, which premiered on June 23, 2011 on the USA Network. It revolves around Mike Ross (Patrick J. Adams), who begins working as a law associate for Harvey Specter (Gabriel Macht), despite never attending law school. The show focuses on Harvey and Mike managing to close cases, while maintaining Mike's secret.

The series was renewed for an eighth season on January 30, 2018. In January 2019, the series was renewed for a ninth and final season which premiered on July 17, 2019.

Series overview

Episodes

Season 1 (2011)

Season 2 (2012–13)

Season 3 (2013–14)

Season 4 (2014–15)

Season 5 (2015–16)

Season 6 (2016–17)

Season 7 (2017–18)

Season 8 (2018–19)

Season 9 (2019)

Special

Ratings

Home video releases

References

External links
Official website

Episodes
Lists of American drama television series episodes